Hypocala violacea is a species of moth of the family Erebidae first described by Arthur Gardiner Butler in 1879. It is found in the Indo-Australian tropics of India, Sri Lanka, and Myanmar.

Description
The adult forewings are a uniform rufous and violet brown, marks on the distal margin being reduced to a pair of dots at the tornus, the inner one white, the outer one black, ringed white, an enlarged member of the marginal row of white dots. The hindwing underside is broadly fawn over the anterior half, with darker striae. Sri Lankan specimens have black markings on dorsal side of hindwings and ventral side of forewings are rather narrow.

The caterpillar has a variably orange to black head, and black body. Around each spiracle, there is an orange patch. Its ventral surface is fuscous green.
The larvae feed on Diospyros species.

References

External links
Species info
Australian Faunal Directory

Moths of Australia
Hypocalinae
Moths of Asia
Moths of Japan
Moths described in 1879